John Richard "Johno" Johnson GCSG (26 July 1930 – 9 August 2017) was an Australian politician. He served as President of the New South Wales Legislative Council from 1978 to 1991.

Career
Born in Murwillumbah, New South Wales, he was a grocer and trade union official before entering politics. He married Pauline Christina Russell, with whom he adopted two sons and two daughters. He served as director of the Prince of Wales Hospital in Sydney and was chair of the Catholic Newspaper Company, publishers of The Catholic Weekly. He was also a member of the boards of NSW Lotteries and Cancer Council Australia.

In 1976, he was elected to the New South Wales Legislative Council for the Labor Party, having been Treasurer of the New South Wales party branch. He served as the council's president from 1978 to 1991, and remained a member of the Legislative Council until his resignation in 2001. He was replaced by Michael Costa.

Honours
In 2001, Johnson was awarded the Centenary Medal. He was made a life member of the Labor Party. In 2006, he was created Knight Commander of the Order of St. Gregory the Great by Pope Benedict XVI for services to the Church in Australia, and was elevated to Knight Grand Cross by Pope Francis in 2016. He was a Fellow of Warrane College, University of New South Wales. Johnson died aged 87 in Sydney on 9 August 2017 and honoured with a state funeral at St Mary's Cathedral, Sydney that month.

References

1930 births
2017 deaths
Members of the New South Wales Legislative Council
Presidents of the New South Wales Legislative Council
Australian monarchists
Australian Labor Party members of the Parliament of New South Wales
Australian Roman Catholics
Recipients of the Centenary Medal
20th-century Australian politicians
21st-century Australian politicians
Knights Grand Cross of the Order of St Gregory the Great